Thomas Hartwell Brown Jr. (July 2, 1890 – August 3, 1972) was a college football and basketball player for the Vanderbilt Commodores of Vanderbilt University. He played next to his brother Charles on the line for the football team. Tom Brown was also a medical doctor.

Early years
Tom Brown was born on July 2, 1890 in Gallatin, Tennessee to Thomas Hartwell Brown, Sr. and Annie Donelson Hunt.

Vanderbilt
Brown graduated from Vanderbilt University with an M. D in 1913. In his senior year he was awarded the title of 'Bachelor of Ugliness,' given to the most liked fellow on campus. Tom Brown was a prominent tackle on Dan McGugin's Vanderbilt Commodores football teams, selected All-Southern. As a freshman, he took part in the scoreless tie of defending national champion Yale.

Toledo

Pro football
In World War I he served in the Army Medical Corps as a lieutenant. While interning at St Vincent's Hospital in Toledo, he played with the Toledo Maroons.  While with them, according to author Emil Klosinski, he played a part in the worst loss ever suffered by legendary coach Knute Rockne, a 40 to 0 win in 1917 over the "South Bend Jolly Fellows Club."

Physician
Brown was an avid member of the Rotary Club for more than 38 years. "He had no peers in his orthopedic ability and contributed greatly to Toledo medicine." He was a Fellow in the American College of Surgeons and President of the Lucas County Academy of Medicine.

References

1890 births
1972 deaths
People from Gallatin, Tennessee
Vanderbilt Commodores football players
Vanderbilt Commodores men's basketball players
American football tackles
All-Southern college football players
Physicians from Tennessee
Sportspeople from Toledo, Ohio
Toledo Maroons players
American men's basketball players